A trailer light converter is an electrical component used for connecting the wiring of a trailer onto a towing vehicle.

See also
Trailer (vehicle)
Tow hitch
Electrical wiring
Trailer connector

References

Trailers